Midway is an unincorporated community in White County, Arkansas, United States.

References

Unincorporated communities in White County, Arkansas
Unincorporated communities in Arkansas